Heinrich Lenczewsky (19 May 1882 – 12 February 1934) was an Austrian footballer. He played in seven matches for the Austria national football team from 1906 to 1909.

References

External links
 

1882 births
1934 deaths
Austrian footballers
Austria international footballers
Place of birth missing
Association footballers not categorized by position